List of historical markers in Kewaunee County, Wisconsin

Historical markers

See also
National Register of Historic Places listings in Kewaunee County, Wisconsin

References

Digital list of Wisconsin Historical Society "official" Markers

External links
Wisconsin Historical Society - Wisconsin Historical Markers

 Wisconsin Historical Markers

Kewaunee
Tourist attractions in Kewaunee County, Wisconsin
Wisconsin-related lists
Lime kilns in the United States